Timothy Charles Harrington (1851 – 12 March 1910), born in Castletownbere, County Cork, was an Irish journalist, barrister, nationalist politician and Member of Parliament (MP) in the House of Commons of the United Kingdom of Great Britain and Ireland.  As a member of the Irish Parliamentary Party he represented Westmeath from February 1883 to November 1885. In 1885 he was elected for the new constituency of Dublin Harbour, which he represented until his death in 1910.  He served as Lord Mayor of Dublin three times from 1901–04.

He was educated at the Catholic University of Ireland and Trinity College Dublin. He owned two newspapers, United Ireland and the Kerry Sentinel and was a member of the so-called Bantry band of prominent nationalist politicians from the Bantry vicinity. They were also more pejoratively known as the Pope's brass band. Tim Healy was another prominent member of this unofficial group.

In 1884, Harrington published a pamphlet, "Maamtrasna Massacres - Impeachment of the Trials" in which he dismantled the Crown Prosecution's case against the eight men accused of the murders of the Joyce family on 17 August 1882. He provided evidence that Crown Prosecutor George Bolton had deliberately suppressed evidence that would have acquitted Myles Joyce, who was hanged, and four men who were sentenced to twenty years of penal servitude.

Harrington was secretary and chief organiser of the Irish National League  (INL), supporter of Charles Stewart Parnell and was largely responsible for devising the agrarian Plan of Campaign in 1886. He became a Parnellite Nationalist when the party split in 1891 continuing as secretary of the INL. In 1897 he proclaimed himself an Independent Nationalist and sided with William O'Brien's United Irish League from its early days. He was briefly considered as a possible alternative to John Redmond as leader of the re-united Irish Parliamentary Party in 1900 when he stood in the general election that year as a Nationalist again.

Thereafter he became excluded from Redmond's closed circle of confidants, he retained sympathy with O'Brien, and represented the interests of the tenant farmers at the 1902 Land Conference negotiations which led to the enactment of the unprecedented Wyndham Land Purchase (Ireland) Act 1903.

Harrington is celebrated by a statue erected in 2001 at the east end of Castletownbere near the Millbrook bar.

On Saturday, 7 September 1901, the then Lord Mayor of Dublin, Tim Harrington kicked off at the official ceremony to open Bohemian FC's new home, Dalymount Park.

Notes

References
  Who's Who of British Members of Parliament, Vol. II 1886-1918, edited by M. Stenton & S. Lees (The Harvester Press 1978)
  Who's Who of "The Long Gestation" Irish Nationalist Life 1891-1918, Patrick Maume, Gill & Macmillan (1999)

External links 
 

1851 births
1910 deaths
19th-century Irish people
Irish journalists
Irish land reform activists
Irish barristers
Irish Parliamentary Party MPs
Parnellite MPs
Independent Nationalist MPs
United Irish League
Members of the Parliament of the United Kingdom for County Dublin constituencies (1801–1922)
Members of the Parliament of the United Kingdom for County Westmeath constituencies (1801–1922)
UK MPs 1880–1885
UK MPs 1885–1886
UK MPs 1886–1892
UK MPs 1892–1895
UK MPs 1895–1900
UK MPs 1900–1906
UK MPs 1906–1910
UK MPs 1910
Lord Mayors of Dublin
Alumni of Trinity College Dublin
Politicians from County Kerry
Politicians from County Cork